Samir Hasanov (born 9 September 1967 in Kirovohrad) is a former Soviet and Ukrainian footballer and Ukrainian football manager.

External links
 
 

1967 births
Living people
Sportspeople from Kropyvnytskyi
Ukrainian people of Azerbaijani descent
Soviet footballers
Ukrainian footballers
Association football midfielders
FC Zirka Kropyvnytskyi players
FC Oleksandriya players
FC Sirius Kryvyi Rih players
FC Krystal Kherson players
FC Khimik Severodonetsk players
FC Zorya Luhansk players
FC Hoverla Uzhhorod players
FC Elektrometalurh-NZF Nikopol players
FC Enerhiya Yuzhnoukrainsk players
Ukrainian Premier League managers
FC Zirka Kropyvnytskyi managers
FC Nyva Ternopil managers
Expatriate football managers in Uzbekistan
Ukrainian expatriate football managers
Ukrainian expatriate sportspeople in Uzbekistan